The Spectre Film Festival is an annual film festival which was created by the French association Les Films du Spectre

The festival is devoted to science fiction, fantasy and horror and takes place every September in Strasbourg

Beginning
First edition
In 2006, members of the association organized the Hammer Festival devoted to films from Hammer Film Productions.

Events
Otherwise, regularly, 'Spectre Film Festival' organizes events named Horror it's Friday with a cult. film of horror showed into film theatres Star and Star Saint Exupery in Strasbourg.

References

External links
 Official website of Spectre Film Festival

Tourist attractions in Strasbourg
Film festivals in France
Fantasy and horror film festivals
Festivals in Strasbourg
Science fiction film festivals